Judith Catherine Rodriguez  (13 February 1936 — 22 November 2018) was an Australian poet. She was a recipient of the Christopher Brennan Award.

Life 

Rodriguez was born Judith Catherine Green in Perth and grew up in Brisbane. She was educated at Brisbane Girls Grammar School, and graduated from the University of Queensland with a Bachelor of Arts. She then travelled to England, where she received a Master of Arts from Cambridge University. Following this she took up a tutorship at Kingston University, Jamaica, where she met her first husband, Colombian academic Fabio Rodriguez.

She published numerous volumes of poetry, some illustrated by her own woodcuts, edited an anthology and the collected poems of Jennifer Rankin. From 1979 to 1982, she was poetry editor of the literary journal Meanjin, and from 1988 to 1997 she was a poetry editor with the publisher Penguin Australia. The play Poor Johanna, co-written with Robyn Archer, was produced in 1994 and her libretto for Moya Henderson's opera Lindy, about the Azaria Chamberlain disappearance, was performed at the Sydney Opera House in 2002. She was a recipient of the Christopher Brennan Award and taught at La Trobe University (1969–1985). In 1989 she took up a lectureship in writing at Victoria College, which in 1993 became part of Deakin University, where she continued to teach until her retirement in 2003. She was made a Member of the Order of Australia in 1994.

Rodriguez died on 22 November 2018. She is survived by her four children and their father, and by her second husband, Tom Shapcott, whom she married in 1982.

Works 
Poetry

Four Poets (as Judith Green), with others. (Melbourne, Cheshire, 1962)
Nu-Plastik Fanfare Red. ( St. Lucia, University of Queensland Press, 1973)
Broadsheet Number 23. (Canberra, Open Door Press, 1976)
Water Life. (University of Queensland Press, 1976)  review
Shadow on Glass. (Canberra: Open Door Press, 1978)
Three Poems. (Melbourne, Old Metropolitan Meat Market, 1979)
Angels. Melbourne, (Old Metropolitan Meat Market, 1979)
Arapede. (Melbourne, Old Metropolitan Meat Market, 1979)
Mudcrab at Gambaro's. (UQP, 1980) 
Witch Heart. (Melbourne: Sisters, 1982) 
Floridian Poems. (Winter Park, Florida, Rollins College, 1986)
New and selected poems: The house by water. (1988) 
The Cold. Canberra, National Library of Australia (Pamphlets Poets), 1992
The Hanging of Minnie Thwaites. (Melbourne, Arcade Publications, 2012) 
The Feather Boy & Other Poems (Sydney, Puncher and Wattmann, 2018) 

Plays

Poor Johanna (produced Adelaide, 1994 ). In Heroines, edited by Dale Spender. Melbourne, Penguin, 1991
Lindy (opera libretto). Music by Moya Henderson.

Edited

Mrs Noah and the Minoan Queen. (Melbourne: Sisters, 1983)
Poems from the Australian's 20th Anniversary Competition. With Andrew Taylor, Sydney, Angus & Robertson, 1985
Jennifer Rankin: Collected Poems. (UQP, 1990)
The Collected Poems of Jennifer Rankin. St. Lucia, University of Queensland Press. 1990

References

External links
6 poems at Thylazine
Interview from The Hindu
Review of Lindy

1936 births
2018 deaths
Australian poets
Australian opera librettists
Members of the Order of Australia
Alumni of the University of Cambridge
University of Queensland alumni
Academic staff of La Trobe University
Australian women poets
Australian women dramatists and playwrights
Women librettists